Elisa Siragusa (born 17 July 1986) is an Italian politician. She was elected as a member of the Five Star Movement and has sat in the Chamber of Deputies since 2018.

Political career 
In January 2022, she joined the Green Europe party.

References

See also 

 List of members of the Italian Chamber of Deputies, 2018–2022

Living people
1986 births
21st-century Italian women politicians
21st-century Italian politicians
Five Star Movement politicians
Green Europe politicians
University of Milano-Bicocca
People from Milan
Deputies of Legislature XVIII of Italy
Women members of the Chamber of Deputies (Italy)